Rudolf, 6th Prince Kinsky of Wchinitz and Tettau (30 March 180227 January 1836) was the 6th Prince Kinsky of Wchinitz and Tettau.

Early life
Rudolf was born at Prague, Kingdom of Bohemia elder son of Ferdinand, 5th Prince Kinsky of Wchinitz and Tettau and Baroness Maria Charlotte Caroline of Kerpen. He became the prince at the age of 9, upon the death of his father in 1812.

Marriage and family
Rudolf married on 12 May 1825 in Prague to Countess Wilhelmine Elisabeth of Colloredo-Mannsfeld (1804–1871), only daughter of Count Hieronymus of Colloredo-Mannsfeld and his wife, Countess Wilhelmine of Waldstein.

They had three children:
Countess Marie Karoline Kinsky of Wchinitz and Tettau (22 September 1832 – 29 December 1904), married in 1850 to Theodor, Graf von Thun und Hohenstein; had issue.
Ferdinand Bonaventura, 7th Prince Kinsky of Wchinitz and Tettau (22 October 1834 –  2 January 1904), married in 1856 to Princess Maria Josepha of Liechtenstein; had issue.
Countess Rudolphine Karoline Kinsky of Wchinitz and Tettau (26 June 1836 – 25 November 1899), married in 1857 to Count Franz Alexander Ernst Noyel of Bellegarde; had issue.

The Rudolph Stone at Bohemian Switzerland in Jetřichovice was named after him. He was owner of Choceň Castle from 1824 until his death in 1836, he was succeeded by his only son Ferdinand Bonaventura.

Ancestry

Notes and sources
Almanach de Gotha, Reference: 1874 150
Genealogisches Handbuch des Adels, Fürstliche Häuser, Reference:

|- 

1802 births
1836 deaths
House of Kinsky
Nobility from Prague